John de Soules (or de Soulis or Soules) (died 1318). He was a prominent member of the de Soules family.

Life
de Soulis joined Robert the Bruce, and was rewarded with a grant of the baronies of Kirkandrews and Torthorwald, and the lands of Brettalach, Dumfriesshire. He accompanied Edward Bruce to Ireland and was slain with him in the Battle of Dundalk on 5 October 1318. His brother William de Soulis was given John's lands and appointed Butler of Scotland.

References
Caroline Colvin "The Invasion of Ireland by Edward Bruce" Pages 41 to 51

External links
article on his family

1318 deaths
Norman warriors
Scoto-Normans
Year of birth unknown
Scottish people of the Wars of Scottish Independence